Vladimir Petrovich Kesarev (26 February 1930 – 19 January 2015) was a Soviet Russian footballer.

Honours
 Soviet Top League winner: 1957, 1959, 1963.

International career
He earned 14 caps for the USSR national football team, and participated in the 1958 FIFA World Cup. He was selected in the squad for the first ever European Nations' Cup in 1960, where the Soviets were champions, but did not play in any games at the tournament.

External links
Profile (in Russian)

1930 births
2015 deaths
Soviet footballers
Soviet Union international footballers
Soviet football managers
1958 FIFA World Cup players
1960 European Nations' Cup players
UEFA European Championship-winning players
FC Dynamo Moscow players
Soviet Top League players

Association football defenders